Julio Ahuet was a Mexican film actor. He appeared in more than a hundred and thirty films during his career, including Women Without Tomorrow (1951), Here Comes Martin Corona (1952), and the El Santo film Profanadores de tumbas (1966).

Selected filmography
 Heads or Tails (1937)
 The Cemetery of the Eagles (1939)
 The Coward (1939)
 In the Times of Don Porfirio (1940)
 The Rock of Souls (1942)
 Jesusita in Chihuahua (1942)
 Beautiful Michoacán (1943)
 The Circus (1943)
 María Eugenia (1943)
 The Spectre of the Bride (1943)
 Cuando habla el corazón (1943)
 The Tiger of Jalisco (1947)
 The Genius (1948)
 Spurs of Gold (1948)
 Midnight (1949)
 Port of Temptation (1951)
 Maria Islands (1951)
 Women Without Tomorrow (1951)
 We Maids (1951)
 Here Comes Martin Corona (1952)
The Martyr of Calvary (1952)
 The Bandits of Cold River (1956)

References

Bibliography 
 Ibarra, Jesús. Los Bracho: tres generaciones de cine mexicano. UNAM, 2006.
 Gallardo Saborido, Emilio José. Gitana tenías que ser: las Andalucías imaginadas por las coproducciones fílmicas España-latinoamérica. Centro de Estudios Andaluces, 2010.
 Pitts, Michael R. Columbia Pictures Horror, Science Fiction and Fantasy Films, 1928-1982. McFarland, 2014.

External links 
 

Year of birth unknown
Year of death unknown
Mexican male film actors